The Central Committee (CC) composition was elected by the 9th Congress, and sat from 5 April 1920 until 16 March 1921. The CC 1st Plenary Session renewed the composition of the Politburo, Secretariat and the Organizational Bureau (OB) of the Russian Communist Party (Bolsheviks).

Plenary sessions

Composition

Members

Candidates

References

General

Plenary sessions, apparatus heads, ethnicity (by clicking on the individual names on "The Central Committee, elected IXth Congress of the RCP (B) 04.05.1920 members" reference), the Central Committee full- and candidate membership, Politburo membership, Secretariat membership and Orgburo membership were taken from these sources:

Bibliography

Sources

Central Committee of the Communist Party of the Soviet Union
1920 establishments in Russia
1921 disestablishments in Russia